Wayne State magazine is published by the Wayne State University Alumni Association.  The quarterly publication consistently has been ranked the No. 1 benefit for alumni association members and has received many local and national awards in recent years.

History and profile
The magazine was founded in 1987 by Marguerite Rigby, former executive director of the Wayne State University Alumni Association. Rigby retired in 2009. The magazine covers a range of topics, including Wayne State University, its alumni, and the Midtown, Detroit community. "Talk of the Town," a feature article highlighting the development of Midtown Detroit and Wayne State's role in it, received several recent awards. It was written by the magazine's editor, Michelle Franzen Martin.

In 2013, the magazine was 76 pages. A digital version also is available.

The magazine received 11 awards in 2005 and 2006. They include a silver OZZIE award, a nationally recognized honor for the magazine's spring 2006 redesign. Other recent awards were given by the Council for the Advancement and Support of Education district V; Awards for Publication Excellence; and the International Association of Business Communicators. In 2007, the magazine and other Wayne State University Alumni Association communications were honored with a first-place Teresa Exline Best Practices in Marketing and Communications award from the Council for the Advancement and Support of Education district V.

Since 2005 alone, Wayne State magazine has received nearly 25 awards from local and national organizations. The magazine earned four awards alone in 2010 from the Society of Professional Journalists. In 2013, it won seven awards from the Society of Professional Journalists.

References

External links
 

1987 establishments in Michigan
Alumni magazines
Quarterly magazines published in the United States
Magazines established in 1987
Magazines published in Detroit
Wayne State University